Against a Crooked Sky is a 1975 American Western film directed by Earl Bellamy and starring Richard Boone, Stewart Petersen, and Henry Wilcoxon.

Plot summary 

The eldest daughter of a pioneer family is kidnapped by a mysterious Indian tribe and the eldest son pursues. In order to win back his sister's freedom, he must sacrifice his own life by passing the test of "Crooked Sky" and shield his sister from an executioner's arrow. Along the way, he recruits a broken down, drunk prospector and his dog to help him track down the unknown tribe and rescue his sister.

Cast 
 Richard Boone as Russian
 Stewart Petersen as Sam Sutter
 Henry Wilcoxon as Cut Tongue / Narrator
 Clint Ritchie as John Sutter
 Shannon Farnon as Molly Sutter
 Jewel Blanch as Charlotte Sutter
 Brenda Venus as Ashkea
 Geoffrey Land as Temkai
 Gordon Hanson as Chief Shumeki
 Vince St. Cyr as Cheyenne Chief Shokobob
 Margaret Willey as Old Hag
 Norman Walke as Milt Adams
 George Dale as Bob
 Bar Killer as B'ar Killer

Production
Parts of the film were shot in Professor Valley, Martin Ranch, Pace Creek, Castle Valley, Dud's Bottom, Arches National Park, Dead Horse Point, and the Dolores River in Utah.

The novelisation was issued by Eleanor Lamb and Douglas Stewart, Bantam Books, 1976.

Soundtrack 
 Jewel Blanch - "Against a Crooked Sky" (Music by Lex de Azevedo, lyrics by Mac David)

Reception

See also
 List of American films of 1975
 List of films in the public domain in the United States

References

External links 
 
 

1975 films
1975 Western (genre) films
American Western (genre) films
Films directed by Earl Bellamy
Films shot in Utah
1975 drama films
1970s English-language films
1970s American films